Galina Dolya (born 2 March 1933) is a Soviet athlete. She competed in the women's high jump at the 1960 Summer Olympics.

References

1933 births
Living people
Athletes (track and field) at the 1960 Summer Olympics
Soviet female high jumpers
Olympic athletes of the Soviet Union
Place of birth missing (living people)